The Strip is an Australian television show which aired from 4 September 2008 to 27 November 2008 on the Nine Network. The series was cancelled in November 2008, due to disappointing ratings. The series took much inspiration from CSI: Miami with its aerial shots of beaches and sparkling surf, and was filmed on location on the Gold Coast, Queensland.

Cast
 Aaron Jeffery - Detective Jack Cross
 Vanessa Gray - Detective Frances "Frankie" Tully
 Simone McAullay - Plain Clothes Constable Jessica Mackay
 Bob Morley - Plain Clothes Constable Tony Moretti
 Frankie J. Holden - Inspector Max Nelson

List of episodes

References

External links
 The Strip Official Website

Lists of Australian drama television series episodes
2008 Australian television seasons